The team competition of the open water swimming events at the 2011 World Aquatics Championships was held on July 21. Each team consisted of 3 swimmers, two men and one woman, who swam 5 km each.

Medalists

Results
The race was held on July 21.

References

External links
2011 World Aquatics Championships: Team start list, from OmegaTiming.com; retrieved 2011-07-20.

Team
World Aquatics Championships